John Ogilvie, SJ (1580 – 10 March 1615) was a Scottish Jesuit martyr. For his work as a priest in service to a persecuted Catholic community in 17th century Scotland, and in being hanged for his faith, he became the only post-Reformation Scottish saint.

Ogilvie was brought up a Calvinist and sent to continental Europe to further his education. His interest piqued by the popular debates going on between Catholic and Calvinist scholars, he took up studies with the Benedictines, and then with the Jesuits. He became a Jesuit and was sent to Scotland, where he worked among the few Catholics in the area of Glasgow. Arrested after less than a year, he was hanged at Glasgow Cross in 1615.

Biography
John was the eldest son of Walter Ogilvie, a respected Calvinist who owned the estate of Drumnakeith in Banffshire. His family was partly Roman Catholic and partly Presbyterian. At the age of twelve he was sent to continental Europe to be educated. He attended a number of Catholic educational establishments, under the Benedictines at Regensburg in Germany and with the Jesuits at Olmutz and Brunn in Moravia.

In the midst of the religious controversies and turmoil that engulfed the Europe of that era, he decided to become a Catholic. In 1597, aged seventeen, he was received into the Catholic Church by Cornelius a Lapide S.J., professor of sacred scripture at Leuven, Belgium. Ogilvie joined the Society of Jesus in 1599 and was ordained a priest at Paris in 1613. After ordination he served in Rouen in Normandy where he made repeated requests to be sent to Scotland to minister to the few remaining Catholics in the Glasgow area. (After 1560 it had become illegal there to preach, proselytise for, or otherwise endorse Catholicism.)

It was his hope that some Catholic nobles there would aid him, given his lineage. Finding none, he went to London, then back to Paris, and finally returned to Scotland in November 1613 disguised as a horse trader named John Watson. Thereafter he began to preach in secret, celebrating Mass clandestinely in private homes. This ministry was to last less than a year. In October 1614, Ogilvie was discovered and arrested in Glasgow under the orders of Archbishop Spottiswood, and was imprisoned. He was initially treated well, but after continually refusing to confess, was tortured by sleep deprivation. He aggravated his position by refusing to pledge allegiance to King James, and it was for this crime that he was tried. During the trial he accused the king of 'playing the runagate from God' and stated he would acknowledge him no more than an 'old hat'. Found guilty, he was hanged at Glasgow Cross on 10 March 1615, aged thirty-six. The customary beheading and quartering were omitted owing to undisguised popular sympathy, and his body was hurriedly buried in the churchyard of Glasgow cathedral.

Ogilvie's last words were: "If there be here any hidden Catholics, let them pray for me but the prayers of heretics I will not have." After he was pushed from the stairs, he threw his concealed rosary out into the crowd. According to legend, one of his enemies caught it and subsequently became a devout, lifelong Catholic. After his execution Ogilvie's followers were rounded up and put in jail. They suffered heavy fines, but none received the death penalty.

Veneration
As a martyr of the Reformation and the Counter-Reformation he was declared Venerable in the seventeenth century. Ogilvie was beatified in 1929 and canonised in 1976 on 17 October, becoming the only post-Reformation Scottish saint. His feast day is celebrated on 10 March in the Catholic Church in Scotland. In the rest of the world it is celebrated on 14th October. In Corby, Northamptonshire — an English town with a strong Scottish heritage — a Catholic church registered in March 1980 is dedicated to John Ogilvie. In the Scottish Highlands there is the Parish of Saint John Ogilvie comprising the Churches of Saint Joseph’s in Invergordon and Saint Vincent De Paul’s in Tain. At the service to mark the quadricentenary of his death, he was described as "Scotland's only Catholic martyr".

See also
George Wishart
List of Protestant martyrs of the Scottish Reformation
Forty Martyrs of England and Wales
List of Catholic martyrs of the English Reformation
John Black (martyr)
George Douglas (martyr)
William Gibson (martyr)
Patrick Primrose
Hugh Barclay of Ladyland,  David Graham, Laird of Fintry,  Spanish blanks plot
Alexander Cameron (priest)
Saint John Ogilvie, patron saint archive

References

Sources

Jesuit saints
1579 births
1615 deaths
Catholic saints who converted from Protestantism
Canonizations by Pope Paul VI
17th-century Christian saints
17th-century Roman Catholic martyrs
17th-century Scottish people
Martyred Roman Catholic priests
People from Keith, Moray
Scottish Roman Catholic saints
Executed Scottish people
Converts to Roman Catholicism from Calvinism
17th-century executions by Scotland
Scottish Roman Catholic priests
Scottish Jesuits
Scottish torture victims
People executed for treason against Scotland
17th-century Jesuits
Palacký University Olomouc alumni
Scottish Catholic martyrs